Murjan Mosque is a historic mosque on Al Rasheed Street in the Shorja marketplace in Baghdad, Iraq, . 

The madrasa had taught the four Sunni maddhabs and was sustained by the supplies from Baghdad. Later the hospital that overlooked the Tigris was established for the students of science. The hospital was equipped with cafe as well. After the death of Murjan in 1353, he was buried in the madrasa and the dome was erected on top of his tomb. However, the madrasa and dome were later demolished in 1946 to expand the Al Rasheed Street.

Renovation was conducted in 1973 by the Ministry of Endowment and the Religious Affairs. The prayer room is topped by one main dome and two small domes, and the mosque is enclosed by the wall.

Gallery

See also 

 Islam in Iraq
 List of mosques in Iraq

References

14th-century mosques
Mosques in Baghdad